The Adam Smith Business School (formerly known as 'Adam Smith School of Economics and Finance') at the University of Glasgow continues an academic record which dates back to the father of economics, Adam Smith (1723–1790). Serving as Professor of Moral Philosophy, he published a series of seminal works such as The Theory of Moral Sentiments, The Wealth of Nations and Lectures on Jurisprudence; the culmination of which set a foundational precedent for classical economic theory 300 years after the university's inception in 1451.

The school continues research in international finance, international economics and macroeconomics. As of 2016 the business school offered four undergraduate, 35 postgraduate as well as various PhD degrees and is one of few institutions holding the honourable triple crown accreditation.

Notable people

Professors
 Professor Ronald MacDonald

References

Schools of the University of Glasgow
Business schools in Scotland
Hillhead